Agnes Kripps (née Semeniuk; November 28, 1925 – January 5, 2014) was a Canadian politician. She served in the Legislative Assembly of British Columbia from 1970 to 1972  from the electoral district of Vancouver South, a member of the Social Credit Party. She was of Ukrainian descent.

References

1925 births
2014 deaths
British Columbia Social Credit Party MLAs
Politicians from Winnipeg
20th-century Canadian politicians
20th-century Canadian women politicians
Women MLAs in British Columbia
Canadian people of Ukrainian descent